During the 2004–05 English football season, Preston North End F.C. competed in the Football League Championship.

Season summary
When Preston went down 1–0 at Brighton thanks to a Marlon Broomes own goal on 28 August 2004, a day later, Craig Brown was sacked and replaced with his assistant Billy Davies.

Davies took Preston to the 2005 play-off final for the first time since 2001, at Cardiff's Millennium Stadium but once again Preston ended up on the losing side, this time to West Ham United, losing 1–0.

Final league table

Results
Preston North End's score comes first

Legend

Football League Championship

Championship play-offs

FA Cup

League Cup

Squad

Left club during season

Transfers

In
  Callum Davidson: from  Leicester City, Free
  Gavin Ward: from  Coventry City, Free
  Youl Mawéné: from  Derby County, Free
  Patrick Agyemang: from  Gillingham, £350,000
  Chris Sedgwick: from  Rotherham United, £400,000
  Matt Hill: from  Bristol City, £100,000
  David Nugent: from  Bury, Signed
  Carlo Nash: from  Middlesbrough, Signed

Out
  Paul Carvill: to  Accrington Stanley, Free
  Ricardo Fuller: to  Portsmouth, Signed
  David Healy: to  Leeds United, Signed
  Kelvin Langmead: to  Shrewsbury Town, Free
  Ciarán Lyng: to  Shrewsbury Town, Free
  Jonathan Gould: to  Bristol City, Free
  Darran Kempson: to  Morecambe, Free
  Kyle Armstrong: to  York City, Signed

References

Preston North End F.C. seasons
Preston North End F.C.